Tae-hyun, also spelled Tae-hyeon, is a Korean masculine given name. Its meaning differs based on the hanja used to write each syllable of the name. There are 20 hanja with the reading "tae" and 35 hanja with the reading "hyun" on the South Korean government's official list of hanja which may be registered for use in given names.

People with this name include:
Kim Tae-hyun (born 1969), South Korean weightlifter
Samuel Youn (born Yoon Tae-hyun, 1971), South Korean operatic bass baritone
Cha Tae-hyun (born 1976), South Korean actor
Jin Tae-hyun (born 1981), South Korean actor
Tae Hyun Bang (born 1983), South Korean mixed martial artist
Jeon Soo-hyun (born Jeon Tae-hyun, 1986), South Korean football goalkeeper
Roh Tae-hyun (born 1993), South Korean singer, former member of boy band Hotshot
Nam Tae-hyun (born 1994), South Korean singer, member of band South Club
Hwang Tae-hyeon (born 1999), South Korean football midfielder

Fictional characters:
 Kim Tae-hyun from 2015 television series Yong-pal

See also
List of Korean given names

References

Korean masculine given names